River Inny may refer to the following rivers in Britain and Ireland:

 River Inny, Cornwall
 River Inny (County Kerry)
 River Inny (Leinster)